Ganges, was a whaleship from Nantucket, Massachusetts, launched in 1809 in Massachusetts, that operated in the Pacific Ocean from 1815 to 1853. It was probably the vessel reported to have found Gardner Island in the Phoenix group. Although Barzillai Folger, the master of the ship during its voyage of 1835-39, is sometimes credited with being the first to discover the right whales of the Northwest coast, the Frenchman Narcisse Chaudiere, in Gange, preceded Folger. Chaudiere cruised on this ground during the summer of 1835, while Folger didn't leave port until October 26 of the same year.

Discovery of Gardner Island
His discovery was reported in the Nantucket Enquirer, December 1827. However, contemporary Joshua Coffin (also reportedly on Ganges) is sometimes credited with the discovery, naming the island after his ship's owner, Gideon Gardner.

Voyages
Between 1815 and 1858, Ganges made 11 whaling voyages:

Citations and references
Citations

References
 Dunmore, John (1992); Who's Who in Pacific Navigation, Australia:Melbourne University Press, 
 Laing, Alexander (1971) American ships. (American Heritage Press). 
 Mawer, Granville Allen; Ahab's Trade: The Saga of South Seas Whaling
 Stackpole, Edouard A.; The Sea Hunters: The New England Whalemen During Two Centuries, 1635-1835

1809 ships
Whaling ships
History of Kiribati